Lucas Alves Sotero da Cunha, or simply Lucas Sotero, is a Brazilian footballer.

Career
He played in FC Dinamo Minsk on loan from Atlético Paranaense until he returned in early 2011.

Career statistics
(Correct )

References

External links
 Profile at ogol.com
 

1991 births
Living people
Brazilian footballers
Brazilian expatriate footballers
Club Athletico Paranaense players
FC Dinamo Minsk players
Futebol Clube Santa Cruz players
Figueirense FC players
Villa Nova Atlético Clube players
Paraná Clube players
Concórdia Atlético Clube players
Anápolis Futebol Clube players
Sampaio Corrêa Futebol Clube players
Cortuluá footballers
Unión Magdalena footballers
Belarusian Premier League players
Campeonato Brasileiro Série B players
Campeonato Brasileiro Série D players
Categoría Primera A players
Categoría Primera B players
Association football midfielders
Brazilian expatriate sportspeople in Belarus
Brazilian expatriate sportspeople in Colombia
Expatriate footballers in Belarus
Expatriate footballers in Colombia
People from Natal, Rio Grande do Norte
Sportspeople from Rio Grande do Norte